Ganga Devi Mahila College is a degree college in Kankarbagh, Bihar, India. It is a constituent unit of Patliputra University. College offers Senior secondary education and Undergraduate degree in Arts and Science.

History 
College was established in 1971. It became a constituent unit of Patliputra University in 2018.

Degrees and courses 
College offers the following degrees and courses.

 Bachelor's degree
 Bachelor of Arts
 Bachelor of Science
 Senior Secondary
 Intermediate of Arts
 Intermediate of Science

References

External links 

 Official website of college
 Patliputra University website

Constituent colleges of Patliputra University
Educational institutions established in 1971
Universities and colleges in Patna
1971 establishments in Bihar